Jane Milmore (March 25, 1955 – February 4, 2020) was an American playwright, screenwriter, television producer and actress.

Biography
Born in Laramie, Wyoming, to Joan Marie Judge and John Edward Milmore, Milmore was of Irish descent and was one of five girls, including romance author Kaitlin O'Riley and actress Jennifer Milmore. Raised in New York and New Jersey attending school in Brooklyn, she graduated from Keansburg High School in Keansburg, New Jersey. Milmore married television producer Richard Vaczy, best known for the classic comedy series Golden Girls, on October 24, 2004. The couple split their time between homes in Beverly Hills, California, and Rumson, New Jersey. She died on February 4, 2020, from pancreatic cancer at the age of 64.

Career
Milmore wrote 23 published plays with Billy Van Zandt.
She wrote and executive produced numerous television series. She won both a People's Choice and an NAACP award for series Martin, a Prism Award for The Hughleys and was nominated for an Emmy for the CBS special I Love Lucy the Very First Show. As an actress, she appeared in numerous TV series and made-for-TV movies. She also appeared in the feature film A Wake in Providence. She performed Off-Broadway in the shows Silent  Laughter,  Drop Dead! and  You've Got Hate Mail.

References

External links 

Van Zandt/Milmore website
 You've Got Hate Mail website
SilentLaughter website
The Samuel French website

1955 births
2020 deaths
American television actresses
American women screenwriters
American women dramatists and playwrights
People from Keansburg, New Jersey
People from Laramie, Wyoming
People from Rumson, New Jersey
Screenwriters from New Jersey
Screenwriters from Wyoming
Actresses from Wyoming
Actresses from New Jersey
American television writers
American women television writers
American people of Irish descent
20th-century American actresses
20th-century American dramatists and playwrights
Television producers from New Jersey
21st-century American women